Dyana Williams (born November 9, 1953), a native New Yorker, is a radio and music industry professional, journalist, community activist, artist development and media coach, and documentarian, as well as the founder of Influence Entertainment and co-founder of the Pennsylvania-based non-profit advocacy organization, the International Association of African American Music Foundation (IAAAM Foundation).

Williams has worked for over four decades in radio and on television. She hosted a weekly broadcast, Afternoon Delight, on Radio One's Classix 107.9 and co-hosted Soulful Sunday with Derrick Sampson. Williams was an entertainment correspondent for Chasing News with Bill Spadea on Fox 5 in New York and My9NJ. Williams serves as a frequent commentator in TV One's docu-series Unsung.

Career

Early years
Williams started her professional broadcasting career when she was hired in 1973 by radio boss, Bob "Nighthawk" Terry to join the staff of 96.3 WHUR-FM in Washington D.C.. Her radio handle was Ebony Moonbeams. Two years later, legendary radio icon, Frankie Crocker hired Williams at Inner City Broadcasting's 107.5 WBLS-FM in her hometown, New York City. In 1978, she became the first African American/Latina woman rock DJ at the ABC FM affiliate, WRQX-FM. Williams made a move to television when she became an arts and culture contributing reporter for P.M. Magazine on the CBS affiliate, WDVM. After moving to Philadelphia in 1980, Williams established a show called "Love on the Menu" for 105.3 WDAS. Williams also did freelance entertainment reporting for Black Entertainment Television, and served as a music consultant for The Soul of VH1 where she interviewed prominent recording artists. Closely associated with "TSOP" (The Sound Of Philadelphia) and Philadelphia's jazz and soul artists, she produced and narrated The Philadelphia Music Makers in 1990. It aired on the Philadelphia PBS outlet, WHYY. As a writer, Williams has contributed to The Philadelphia Tribune, Billboard Magazine and The Philadelphia New Observer.

Later years
In 1990, Williams and Sheila Eldridge launched the Association of African American Music Foundation (IAAAM Foundation) to promote and preserve Black music.   Williams co-wrote House Concurrent Bill 509, which recognized African American accomplishments in music and helped established African-American Music Appreciation Month originally started as "Black Music Month". In 1997, Williams earned her B.A. degree in television, radio and film from Temple University, graduating cum laude. 

Williams frequently lectures about African-American music and popular culture to universities, colleges, and music conferences throughout the United States and around the world. Williams has been interviewed by CNN's Anderson Cooper, Tavis Smiley, and Tom Joyner among others. The recipient of numerous awards and recognition, Williams has received citations from: the Commonwealth of Pennsylvania's House of Representative: State Senator David P. Richardson, December 9, 1987, a proclamation from Congressman Chaka Fattah, February 11, 2000, a Liberty Bell from Mayor John F. Street, March 18, 2000, City Council City of Philadelphia Citation from Councilman-At-Large, W.Wilson Goode, Jr., November 8, 2003, City of Philadelphia Citation from Mayor John F. Street, May 28, 2003 and was honored with Dyana Williams Day in the City of Philadelphia by Councilwoman Donna Reed Miller and all members of the City Council, November 6, 2008. The Southeastern Pennsylvania March of Dimes presented Williams with the 2006 Achievement in Radio A.I.R Award for the Best Weekend Show in Philadelphia, November 1, 2006. Dyana has been a frequent on air commentator on the award-winning and highly acclaimed music documentary series, Unsung, on the TV One network. She also served as co-executive producer of the Teddy Pendergrass Unsung episode. In 2011, News One listed Williams as #7 on the "Top 20 Black Radio Jockeys of All Time" and RadioFacts.com recognized her as #8 on the "Top 30 Black Women in Media." In 2014, Philadelphia Mayor Michael Nutter, presented a proclamation to Williams for her dedication and effort to augment the Philadelphia slogan: The City of Brotherly Love, adding Sisterly Affection, acknowledging the inclusion of women.

She is on the board of the National Museum of African American Music.

Personal life
Williams is mother to Caliph Gamble, Isa Salahdeen Gamble and Princess Idia Gamble, from her former union with Grammy award-winning songwriter/producer and Rock and Roll Hall of Fame inductee, Kenny Gamble.

References

External links

Influence Entertainment Official Website
Dyana Williams on YouTube
Dyana Williams on IMDb
https://www.vibe.com/2019/06/black-music-month-history
https://www.huffpost.com/entry/black-music-month-co-founder-dyana-williams_n_5433853
https://www.philly.com/philly/entertainment/20140603_Who_ya_gonna_call__Dyana_Williams_.htm
https://newsone.com/1093115/top-20-radio-jockeys-of-all-time/
https://www.thehistorymakers.org/biography/dyana-williams-40

Living people
Place of birth missing (living people)
1953 births
Temple University alumni